Evgeny Tyrtyshnikov (born 1955) is a Russian mathematician, Dr.Sc., Professor, Academician of the Russian Academy of Sciences, a professor at the Faculty of Computer Science at the Moscow State University.

He graduated from the faculty MSU CMC (1977). Has been working at Moscow State University since 2004.

He defended the thesis "Matrices of the Toeplitz type and their applications" for the degree of Doctor of Physical and Mathematical Sciences (1990).

Was awarded the title of Professor (1996), Corresponding Member of the Russian Academy of Sciences (2006), Academician of the Russian Academy of Sciences (2016).

Author of 12 books and more than 130 scientific articles.

Research interests: linear algebra and its applications, asymptotic analysis of matrix spectra, integral equations of mathematical physics, computational methods.

References

Bibliography

External links
 Russian Academy of Sciences
 Annals of the Moscow University
 MSU CMC
 Scientific works of Evgeny Tyrtyshnikov
 Scientific works of Evgeny Tyrtyshnikov

Russian computer scientists
Russian mathematicians
Living people
Academic staff of Moscow State University
1955 births
Moscow State University alumni